Association of Kannada Kootas of America (also referred to as AKKA) is a non-profit organization primarily aimed at networking for Kannadigas in the United States and Canada. It is incorporated in Florida. AKKA was founded in February 1998, after the World Kannada Sammelana in Phoenix, Arizona, where officebearers were elected. The organization organizes Kannada sammelanas (conferences) in the continent, the most recent one being held in Dallas, TX.

Advocacy and opinion
At the recent conference in Edison, the Putthige matha seer Sugunendrateertha Swamiji has praised AKKA for its efforts in maintaining the Kannada language in the American continent. However, at the same conference, some Kannada artistes and litterateurs were unhappy with basic facilities provided. and criticized the organizers.  Following this reaction, the Government of Karnataka, which financially aids AKKA contemplated withdrawing aid.

Split
In 2009, 7 founder members of AKKA and others decided to break away from the organization and formed the North America Vishwa Kannada Association.

References

External links 
 AKKA website

Karnataka society
Kannada organizations in North America
1998 establishments in the United States